Jarmo Lehtinen (born 3 January 1969) is a rally co-driver from Finland. He was the co-driver to former World Rally Championship driver Mikko Hirvonen and have scored 15 WRC wins competing under Ford World Rally Team and  Citroën Total. As of 2019, he is current co-driver for M-Sport driver Teemu Suninen.

Career
Lehtinen started co-driving in 1988 alongside friend Jari Mikkola. He later partnered Marko Ramanen in the Finnish Rally Championship, and he made his WRC debut in the 1997 Rally Finland. In 1999 Lehtinen partnered Ramanen in the British Rally Championship and accompanied Jouni Ampuja to sixth in Group N in the Finnish Championship. He worked with Ampuja in the Finnish Championship for another two seasons. In 2002 he took up a new role in the gravel crew for Skoda driver Toni Gardemeister on the world championship. He also began to work with Hirvonen on international events. The pair have worked together on all their WRC outings since 2003, with Subaru in 2004 and with Ford since 2006, becoming runners-up in 2008. He won his first world rally at the 2006 Rally Australia. Lehtinen and Hirvonen competed for Citroën in 2012.

WRC victories

Complete WRC results

References

External links

 Jarmo's profile on wrc.com

1969 births
Living people
Finnish rally co-drivers
World Rally Championship co-drivers